Broderick Smith (born 17 February 1948) is an English-born Australian multi-instrumentalist, singer-songwriter and sometime actor. He was a member of 1970s bands Sundown, Carson and the Dingoes, 1980s Broderick Smith's Big Combo and he has recorded and performed solo and in duos. He acted on stage in the 1973 Australian version of the rock opera, Tommy, and in minor roles in 1990s TV series, Blue Heelers, Snowy River: The McGregor Saga and State Coroner. Smith has been involved with the writing of some 200 songs and has run workshops on song writing, harmonica and vocals. He is the father of Ambrose Kenny-Smith, who has provided vocals, harmonica and keyboards for the rock band King Gizzard and the Lizard Wizard since their formation in 2010.

Early years
Broderick Smith was born in Hertfordshire, England and, with his father Richard, mother Millicent (née Stone) and a younger sibling, migrated to Australia in April 1959 via RMS Orion out of the Port of Tilbury. They settled under the Assisted Passage Migration Scheme, initially, in St Albans a western suburb of Melbourne. He later recalled, "I remember going to [a] sideshow in St Albans as a kid and seeing a dancing chicken. But I didn't know they were on hot plates at the time. I thought wow – dancing chickens, why are their feet smoking?" He left secondary school in 1963 and worked as a messenger boy. From 1965, he was a sales clerk for Allans retail music store for three years. In the mid-1960s, he moved to Craigieburn.

Starting music career 
According to Australian musicologist, Ian McFarlane, "blessed with a masterful blues voice, Smith has retained an interest in roots music right throughout his career." Smith's early influences were, "Muddy Waters, John Lee Hooker and Charlie Musselwhite." In 1962 or 1963 Smith was a member of the Maltese Band on percussion. Other blues groups he joined included the Smokey Hollows in 1965. He joined Adderley Smith Blues Band (1966–68) on vocals and harmonica, alongside Kerryn Tolhurst on guitar and mandolin. Smith had to leave the group when he was conscripted into the army as part of his National Service during the Vietnam War. From 1968 to 1970, he was stationed at Holsworthy Barracks in New South Wales. Upon his discharge, Smith briefly joined a country music group, Sundown, with Tolhurst, but left in 1971.

1971–1973: Carson 

Carson formed in January 1970 and was a blues-boogie band influenced by US group Canned Heat. During 1971, Smith replaced founder John Capek, providing vocals and harmonica. Other members included Greg Lawrie (guitar, slide guitar), Ian Ferguson (bass, vocals), Tony Lunt (drums) and Ian Winter (guitar). After they released a single "Travelling South" / "Moonshine" in August 1971, Ferguson left to be replaced successively by Barry Sullivan and Garry Clarke. Mal Logan (keyboards) joined later that year. Carson performed at the first Sunbury Rock Festival in January 1972. The following Easter, they played a legendary set at the Mulwala Pop Festival, alongside Canned Heat. Smith spent part of 1972 recording two solo singles: "Goin' on Down to the End of the World", released in May 1972, and "Yesterday it Rained", released in February 1973 on the Image label. He also kept up with Carson to record "Boogie, Part 1" / "Boogie, Part 2", which reached No. 30 on the National charts in September 1972. That was followed by their debut album, Blown, on Harvest Records, produced by Rod Coe, which reached No. 14 in December.

Australian psychedelic and progressive rock band Tamam Shud were recording tracks for Albie Falzon's 1972 surf film Morning of the Earth, including their song "First Things First". Their main lead singer, Lindsay Bjerre, was having voice problems so they recorded the song using lead guitarist Tim Gaze. Producer G. Wayne Thomas was unhappy with Gaze's vocals and asked Smith to fill in. According to Bjerre, Tamam Shud only found out about the switch at the film's premiere, but according to Smith, his contribution was made with Tamam Shud's knowledge and permission.

Carson performed at the 1973 Sunbury Rock Festival, on the Australia Day long weekend. Band members Winter and Ferguson left soon after and, by February, Carson had disbanded. A live recording of their Sunbury set, On the Air was released in April 1973.

1973–1978: Tommy to the Dingoes 

The Who's rock opera Tommy was performed in Australia in 1973, in an orchestral version, with Smith in the role of The Father (Mr Walker). Other Australian artists involved were Daryl Braithwaite (as Tommy), Billy Thorpe, Doug Parkinson, Wendy Saddington, Jim Keays, Colleen Hewett, Linda George, Ross Wilson, Bobby Bright, and Ian Meldrum (as "Uncle Ernie" in Sydney).

The Dingoes were formed in Melbourne in April 1973 by Smith's old band mate, Kerryn Tolhurst. The original line-up included Tolhurst (ex-Adderley Smith Blues Band, Sundown, Country Radio) (singer, songwriter, guitars), Chris Stockley (ex-CamPact, Axiom) (guitars), John Strangio (bass), John Lee (ex-Blackfeather (drums)) and Smith (vocals, harmonica). The band was formed to fuse rhythm and blues with Australian bush music but it was generally described as country rock. Their best performed singles were "Way Out West" and "Boy on the Run". Their 1974 debut self-titled album, The Dingoes, peaked at No. 18. They performed at Sunbury Rock Festivals in 1974 and 1975, making Smith one of the few artists who performed at all four Sunbury festivals. From 1976, the Dingoes relocated to USA for their next two albums, Five Times the Sun in 1977 and Orphans of the Storm in 1979. While recording the latter album their management team, headed by Peter Rudge, had been devastated when some members of fellow-signing Lynyrd Skynyrd were killed in a plane crash in October 1977. The Dingoes finally split in February 1979. Smith had already returned to Australia in late 1978.

1979–1988: Big Combo and others 
After his 1978 return to Australia, Smith fronted various bands with his name featured: Broderick Smith's Hired Hands (1978–1979), Broderick Smith's Big Combo (1979–1982), Broderick Smith Band (1982–1985), and Broderick Smith and the Noveltones (1988). Of those, Big Combo provided his best known latter releases, with the singles "Faded Roses" and "My Father's Hands", and the 1981 album Broderick Smith's Big Combo. The line-up of his backing group included, John Ballard on guitar, saxophone and backing vocals, Peter Lee on drums, Mick "the Reverend" O'Connor on keyboards, and Ron Robertson on bass guitar. By October 1982, those four were all members of Tinsley Waterhouse Band.

1990–current: Acting, workshops and duos 
Smith has appeared in brief TV roles including episodes of police drama Blue Heelers in 1994's "Adverse Possession" and 1997's "Bloodstained Angels"; 1998's historical drama Snowy River: The McGregor Saga episode "Prince of Hearts" and crime drama State Coroner episode "On Thin Ice".

 Smith has delivered numerous workshops on song writing, harmonica and vocals to schools within Victoria, writing about 200 songs, and has run workshops on song writing, harmonica and vocals. He considers himself to be primarily a lyricist. His song writing technique typically involves writing the lyrics in prose form, with the music then being written (usually by someone else), with the lyrics then changed to suit the music. Smith believes "lyrics should say something and not just be something to sing along to."
 Smith performed as a duo with Mick Ahearn (keyboards) in the late 1990s and produced other recording artists at Harcourt Valley Recorders. He also performed with Mick O'Connor on piano in the early 2000s, sometimes they added Pip Avent on tuba and Tim O'Connor on drums, with this line-up Smith recorded Too Easy in 2002.
 He played harmonica with the Backsliders, alternating with Ian Collard (of Collard Greens & Gravy) as a replacement for founding member Jim Conway.
 Smith performed live on RocKwiz Episode 74 in January 2009 singing "God May Not Be With Us" and a Duet of the MGMT song "Time to Pretend" with Patience Hodgson from the Grates.
 Smith performed with Tabasco Tom and Doc White, an American blues vocalist, singer songwriter and a Victorian blues and country musician. Participating in several tours around Australia and one in New Zealand in the late 2000s. He also performed on their album, Tabasco Tom & Doc White.
 Smith wrote and narrated the text for the album Eyes Like the Sky by King Gizzard & the Lizard Wizard, released in 2013 and featuring his son Ambrose on harmonica.

Discography

Studio albums

Compilation albums

Other albums

Singles

See also
 Carson (band)
 The Dingoes
 Backsliders (band)

References

External links
 Milesago entry on Carson, on The Dingoes
 Entertain Oz biography
 Corporate Events
 Australian Rock Database entry

1948 births
Living people
English country musicians
English expatriates in Australia
English rock singers
English male singer-songwriters
Musicians from Hertfordshire